HS Tabora was a German hospital ship that was sunk on 26 March 1916 in the port of Dar es Salaam, German East Africa, by the Royal Navy battleship  and protected cruisers  and , and the Royal Australian Navy light cruiser .

Construction 
SS Tabora was built at the Blohm & Voss shipyard in Hamburg, Germany. She was launched on 18 April 1912, and completed on 29 June 1912.

Early career 
During her early career, Tabora steamed many times from German East Africa to Germany and sometimes from South Africa to Southampton in the United Kingdom. In 1914, when World War I broke out, Tabora was converted into a hospital ship for the German colonies in East Africa.

World War I and sinking 
The British suspected that Tabora was not really a hospital ship, but rather operated as a troopship or ammunition transport ship, disguised as a hospital ship with her sides painted with the Red Cross emblem.

The British demanded that the Germans allow them to inspect Tabora to confirm or debunk their suspicions about her. The Germans did not reply. Pioneer received orders to open fire if the German ship made any suspicious move. After time had passed without a reply from Tabora, Pioneer received orders to fire four warning shots from her 4-inch (102-mm) guns. At the same time, Vengeance signaled Tabora asking her to evacuate any wounded she had on board. When Tabora still did not answer, the British ships and Pioneer opened fire on her. An avalanche of shells hit Tabora, and she quickly caught fire. She was shrouded in thickening clouds of black smoke, took on a list to port, and began to sink. The British ships and Pioneer then steamed away without any return fire from the Germans. Tabora rolled onto her side and came to rest on the harbor bottom on her port side, with her starboard side remaining above water. It is unknown if anyone died on Tabora.

Aftermath and wreck 

The sinking of Tabora went virtually unnoticed by both sides. The German Foreign Office did not protest against the British and Australian action, nor did they even issue a statement about the incident. Germany's behavior after the incident indicated that Tabora was not a hospital ship protected under Articles X and XI of the Hague Convention of 1907, and as such that her sinking was not a violation of international maritime law. 

The burned-out wreck of Tabora remained in the harbor of Dar es Salaam until 1955, when she finally was scrapped by the Italian salvage company Mawa Handels Anstalt nearly 40 years after her sinking.

References

1912 ships
Passenger ships of Germany
Hospital ships in World War I
Steamships of Germany
Ships built in Hamburg
Maritime incidents in 1916
World War I ships of Germany
World War I shipwrecks in the Indian Ocean